Dwayne Lee Bacon Jr. (born August 30, 1995) is an American professional basketball player for Panathinaikos of the Greek Basket League and the EuroLeague. He has also played for the Charlotte Hornets and the Orlando Magic in the National Basketball Association (NBA). Bacon played college basketball for the Florida State Seminoles.

High school career

Dwayne Bacon attended the McKeel Academy in his native Lakeland, Florida until transferring to the IMG Academy in Bradenton, Florida for his junior season. At Mckeel Academy, Bacon averaged 23 points, 7 rebounds, and 3 steals as a sophomore in 2012–2013. He led Mckeel to a 17–8 overall record and to the FHSAA championship tournament regional semifinals in 2013. In his junior season of 2013–2014 at IMG Academy Bacon was IMG's leading scorer. In his only season at IMG he averaged 19.3 ppg and led in assist with 4.0 apg while shooting 42% from the field and 70% from the free throw line in 12 games played. Bacon transferred to the Oak Hill Academy for his senior season. On September 5, 2014. Dwayne Bacon committed to Florida State over offers from Oklahoma State, Georgia Tech, and Auburn. In his senior year at Oak Hill, Dwayne Bacon led Oak Hill to an undefeated regular season with a record of 45–0 and averaged 24.4 points per game, 4.4 rebounds per game, 3.4 assists per game, and 2.2 steals per game. He was ranked 14th on ESPN 100. Bacon played for the Showtime Ballers AAU program based in Orlando for three seasons.

College career
Bacon signed with Florida State on September 5, 2015. As a freshman at Florida State, Bacon received the National Freshman of the week honors from CBS Sports on November 21. He was a three time ACC rookie of the week (Nov 16, Dec 21 and 28). In his first career game Bacon had 23 points, 8 rebounds, 2 steals and 1 assist. Bacon achieved his first career win over Charleston Southern with 20 points and 10 rebounds. He appeared in every game during the 2015–16 season for the Seminoles and averaged 15.8 points and 5.8 rebounds over 28.8 minutes per game. On March 23, Bacon announced via Twitter that he would test his draft status for the 2016 NBA draft. He did not hire an agent and retained his amateur status and the ability to return to Florida State for the 2016–17 season. However, on March 28 he announced he will return to college.

During his sophomore season, Bacon was named a member of the All-ACC second team for his work with Florida State that season. After his team was eliminated from the 2017 NCAA tournament, Bacon declared for the 2017 NBA draft (with a commitment that he'd sign with an agent soon afterward) on March 22, 2017.

Professional career

Charlotte Hornets (2017–2020)
On June 22, 2017, Bacon was selected by the New Orleans Pelicans with the 40th overall pick in the 2017 NBA draft. He was later traded to the Charlotte Hornets on draft night. On July 6, he signed with the Hornets. Bacon made his NBA debut on October 18, recording eight points, two rebounds and two assists in a 90–102 loss to the Detroit Pistons. On November 3, he scored a season-high 18 points, alongside seven rebounds, in a 101–108 loss to the San Antonio Spurs. Bacon played in 53 games his rookie season and made six starts. He averaged 3.3 points and 2.3 rebounds per game.

On March 26, 2019, Bacon scored a season-high 24 points, alongside six rebounds and three steals, in a 125–116 overtime win over the San Antonio Spurs. During his sophomore season, Bacon only played in 43 games and made 13 starts due to a stint in the NBA G League with the Hornets' affiliate team, the Greensboro Swarm. However, his numbers improved statistically, with him averaging 7.3 points per game.

On November 2, 2019, Bacon scored a season-high 25 points, alongside six rebounds, two assists and two steals, in a 93–87 win over the Golden State Warriors. During his third season, Bacon regressed statistically, averaging only 5.7 points per game. In June, he stated that instead of staying with the Hornets, he would "go elsewhere."

Orlando Magic (2020–2021)
On November 24, 2020, Bacon signed with his hometown team, the Orlando Magic. He made his Magic debut on December 23, recording three rebounds and three assists in a 113–107 win over the Miami Heat. On May 7, 2021, Bacon logged a career-high 28 points, alongside four rebounds and two assists, in a 112–122 loss to the Charlotte Hornets. During the 2020–21 season, Bacon appeared in all of the Magic's 72 games, made 50 starts, and averaged a career-high 10.9 points per game. On August 8, Bacon was waived by the Magic.

On August 19, 2021, Bacon signed with the New York Knicks. He was waived on October 14.

AS Monaco (2021–2022)
On October 26, 2021, Bacon signed with AS Monaco Basket of the French LNB Pro A.

On September 26, 2022, Bacon signed with the Los Angeles Lakers. He was waived on October 8.

Panathinaikos (2022–present)
On October 21, 2022, Bacon officially signed a two-year deal with Greek club Panathinaikos.

Career statistics

NBA

Regular season

|-
| style="text-align:left;"|
| style="text-align:left;"|Charlotte
| 53 || 6 || 13.5 || .375 || .256 || .899 || 2.3 || .7 || .3 || .0 || 3.3
|-
| style="text-align:left;"|
| style="text-align:left;"|Charlotte
| 43 || 13 || 17.7 || .475 || .437 || .739 || 2.1 || 1.1 || .3 || .1 || 7.3
|-
| style="text-align:left;"|
| style="text-align:left;"|Charlotte
| 39 || 11 || 17.6 || .348 || .284 || .660 || 2.6 || 1.3 || .6 || .1 || 5.7
|-
| style="text-align:left;"|
| style="text-align:left;"|Orlando
| 72 || 50 || 25.7 || .402 || .285 || .824 || 3.1 || 1.3 || .6 || .1 || 10.9
|- class="sortbottom"
| style="text-align:center;" colspan="2"|Career
| 207 || 80 || 19.4 || .402 || .314 || .780 || 2.6 || 1.1 || .5 || .1 || 7.3

College

|-
| style="text-align:left;"|2015–16
| style="text-align:left;"|Florida State
| 34 || 32 || 28.8 || .447 || .281 || .714 || 5.8 || 1.5 || 1.0 || .0 || 15.8
|-
| style="text-align:left;"|2016–17
| style="text-align:left;"|Florida State
| 35 || 35 || 28.8 || .452 || .333 || .754 || 4.2 || 1.7 || 1.0 || .1 || 17.2
|- class="sortbottom"
| style="text-align:center;" colspan="2"|Career
| 69 || 67 || 28.8 || .449 || .312 || .733 || 5.0 || 1.6 || 1.0 || .1 || 16.5

References

External links

 Florida State Seminoles bio

1995 births
Living people
American men's basketball players
American expatriate basketball people in France
American expatriate basketball people in Greece
AS Monaco Basket players
Basketball players from Florida
Charlotte Hornets players
Florida State Seminoles men's basketball players
Greensboro Swarm players
IMG Academy alumni
McDonald's High School All-Americans
New Orleans Pelicans draft picks
Oak Hill Academy (Mouth of Wilson, Virginia) alumni
Orlando Magic players
Panathinaikos B.C. players
Parade High School All-Americans (boys' basketball)
Small forwards
Sportspeople from Lakeland, Florida
United States men's national basketball team players